Henry Lee Adams Jr. (born April 8, 1945) is a senior United States district judge of the United States District Court for the Middle District of Florida.

Education and career

Adams was born in Jacksonville, Florida and graduated from Matthew Gilbert High School in Jacksonville in 1962. He received his Bachelor of Science degree in political science from Florida A&M University in 1966 and his Juris Doctor from Howard University School of Law in 1969.

Adams was awarded Reginald Heber Smith Fellow in April 1969. He completed a Consumer Rights and Poverty Law training program at Haverford College and was assigned to the Duval County Legal Aid Association, a legal aid society in Duval County, Florida, from 1969 to 1970. He was an assistant public defender of the Fourth Judicial Circuit of Florida (Duval, Clay, and Nassau counties) from November 1970 to 1972. In January 1972, he entered private practice in Jacksonville, first with the firm of Sheppard, Fletcher, Hand & Adams and then in 1976 with Marshall and Adams. In October 1979, Florida governor Bob Graham appointed Adams a judge of the Fourth Judicial Circuit.

Federal judicial service

Adams remained a judge on that court until 1993, when President Bill Clinton nominated him to the United States District Court for the Middle District of Florida on October 29, 1993, to the seat vacated by Susan H. Black. Confirmed by the Senate on November 20, 1993, and received commission four days later. Adams was assigned to the Tampa Division of the court from December 1993 until April 2000, when he was reassigned to the Jacksonville Division. Adams assumed senior status on April 8, 2010.

See also 
 List of African-American federal judges
 List of African-American jurists
 List of first minority male lawyers and judges in Florida

References

External links
 Henry Lee Adams Jr. Biographical Statement

1945 births
Living people
Florida A&M University alumni
Howard University School of Law alumni
Florida state court judges
Judges of the United States District Court for the Middle District of Florida
United States district court judges appointed by Bill Clinton
African-American judges
Public defenders
People from Jacksonville, Florida
20th-century American judges
21st-century American judges